The 40th Tactical Aviation Brigade (Military Unit Number  А1789) is a formation of the Ukrainian Air Force, composed primarily of Mikoyan MiG-29 aircraft, that is based at Vasylkiv.

History 
In January 1992 the regiment took the oath of loyalty to the Ukrainian people.

Aircraft
MiG-29, MiG-29UB, MiG-29M1
L39M1

References

Air force brigades of Ukraine